Meijiang Subdistrict is a subdistrict located on the southwestern corner of Hexi District, Tianjin, China. It borders Youyi Road Subdistrict to its north, Jianshan and Taihu Road Subdistricts to its east, Dasi Town to its south, and Liqizhuang Subdistrict to its west. In the year 2010, its population was 27,547.

The subdistrict was formed in 2006. Its name Meijiang can be translated as "Plum River".

Geography 
Meijiang Subdistrict is bypassed by Weijin River, and borders Waihuan River to its south. There are a number of lakes within the subdistrict as well, the largest of which is located in the area south of Weijin River.

Administrative divisions 
In the year 2021, Meijiang Subdistrict consisted of 10 residential communities:

Gallery

References 

Township-level divisions of Tianjin
Hexi District, Tianjin